The Indian peafowl (Pavo cristatus), also known as the common peafowl, and blue peafowl, is a peafowl species native to the Indian subcontinent. It has been introduced to many other countries.  Male peafowl are referred to as peacocks, and female peafowl are referred to as peahens, although both sexes are often referred to colloquially as a "peacock".

Indian peafowl display a marked form of sexual dimorphism. The peacock is brightly coloured, with a predominantly blue fan-like crest of spatula-tipped wire-like feathers and is best known for the long train made up of elongated upper-tail covert feathers which bear colourful eyespots. These stiff feathers are raised into a fan and quivered in a display during courtship. Despite the length and size of these covert feathers, peacocks are still capable of flight. Peahens lack the train, have a white face and iridescent green lower neck, and dull brown plumage. The Indian peafowl lives mainly on the ground in open forest or on land under cultivation where they forage for berries, grains but also prey on snakes, lizards, and small rodents. Their loud calls make them easy to detect, and in forest areas often indicate the presence of a predator such as a tiger. They forage on the ground in small groups and usually try to escape on foot through undergrowth and avoid flying, though they fly into tall trees to roost.

The function of the peacock's elaborate train has been debated for over a century. In the 19th century, Charles Darwin found it a puzzle, hard to explain through ordinary natural selection. His later explanation, sexual selection, is widely but not universally accepted. In the 20th century, Amotz Zahavi argued that the train was a handicap, and that males were honestly signalling their fitness in proportion to the splendour of their trains. Despite extensive study, opinions remain divided on the mechanisms involved.

The bird is celebrated in Hindu and Greek mythology, and is the national bird of India. The Indian peafowl is listed as of Least Concern on the IUCN Red List.

Taxonomy and naming
Carl Linnaeus in his work Systema Naturae in 1758 assigned to the Indian peafowl the technical name of Pavo cristatus (means "crested peafowl" in classical Latin).

The earliest usage of the word in written English is from around 1300 and spelling variants include pecok, pekok, pecokk, peacocke, peacock, pyckock, poucock, pocok, pokok, pokokke, and poocok among others. The current spelling was established in the late 17th century. Chaucer (1343–1400) used the word to refer to a proud and ostentatious person in his simile "proud a pekok" in Troilus and Criseyde (Book I, line 210).

The Sanskrit, later Pali, and modern Hindi term for the animal is maur. It is debated that the nomenclature of the Maurya Empire, whose first emperor Chandragupta Maurya was raised and influenced by peacock farmers, was named after the terminology. 

The Greek word for peacock was taos and was related to the Persian "tavus" (as in Takht-i-Tâvus for the famed Peacock Throne). The Ancient Hebrew word tuki (plural tukkiyim) has been said to have been derived from the Tamil tokei but sometimes traced to the Egyptian tekh. In modern Hebrew the word for peacock is "tavas". In Sanskrit, the peacock is known as Mayura and is associated with the killing of snakes.

Description
Indian peafowl are among the largest and heaviest representatives of the Phasianidae. So far as is known, only the wild turkey grows notably heavier. The green peafowl is slightly lighter in body mass despite the male having a longer train on average than the male of the Indian species. Their size, colour and shape of crest make them unmistakable within their native distribution range. The male is metallic blue on the crown, the feathers of the head being short and curled. The fan-shaped crest on the head is made of feathers with bare black shafts and tipped with bluish-green webbing. A white stripe above the eye and a crescent shaped white patch below the eye are formed by bare white skin. The sides of the head have iridescent greenish blue feathers. The back has scaly bronze-green feathers with black and copper markings. The scapular and the wings are buff and barred in black, the primaries are chestnut and the secondaries are black. The tail is dark brown and the "train" is made up of elongated upper tail coverts (more than 200 feathers, the actual tail has only 20 feathers) and nearly all of these feathers end with an elaborate eye-spot. A few of the outer feathers lack the spot and end in a crescent shaped black tip. The underside is dark glossy green shading into blackish under the tail. The thighs are buff coloured. The male has a spur on the leg above the hind toe.

The adult peahen has a rufous-brown head with a crest as in the male but the tips are chestnut edged with green. The upper body is brownish with pale mottling. The primaries, secondaries and tail are dark brown. The lower neck is metallic green and the breast feathers are dark brown glossed with green. The remaining underparts are whitish. Downy young are pale buff with a dark brown mark on the nape that connects with the eyes. Young males look like the females but the wings are chestnut coloured.

The most common calls are a loud pia-ow or may-awe. The frequency of calling increases before the Monsoon season and may be delivered in alarm or when disturbed by loud noises. In forests, their calls often indicate the presence of a predators such as the tiger. They also make many other calls such as a rapid series of ka-aan..ka-aan or a rapid kok-kok. They often emit an explosive low-pitched honk! when agitated.

Mutations and hybrids

There are several colour mutations of Indian peafowl. These very rarely occur in the wild, but selective breeding has made them common in captivity. The black-shouldered or Japanned mutation was initially considered as a subspecies of the Indian peafowl (P. c. nigripennis) (or even a separate species (P. nigripennis)) and was a topic of some interest during Darwin's time. It is, however, only a case of genetic variation within the population. In this mutation, the adult male is melanistic with black wings. Young birds with the nigripennis mutation are creamy white with fulvous-tipped wings. The gene produces melanism in the male and in the peahen it produces a dilution of colour with creamy white and brown markings. Other forms include the pied and white mutations, all of which are the result of allelic variation at specific loci.

Crosses between a male green peafowl (Pavo muticus) and a female Indian peafowl (P. cristatus) produce a stable hybrid called a "Spalding", named after Mrs. Keith Spalding, a bird fancier in California. There can be problems if birds of unknown pedigree are released into the wild, as the viability of such hybrids and their offspring is often reduced (see Haldane's rule and outbreeding depression).

Distribution and habitat

The Indian peafowl is a resident breeder across the Indian subcontinent and inhabits the drier lowland areas of Sri Lanka. It is found in moist and dry-deciduous forests, but can adapt to live in cultivated regions and around human habitations and is usually found where water is available. In many parts of northern India, they are protected by religious practices and will forage around villages and towns for scraps. Some have suggested that the peacock was introduced into Europe by Alexander the Great, while others say the bird had reached Athens by 450 BCE and may have been introduced even earlier. It has since been introduced in many other parts of the world and has become feral in some areas.

The Indian peafowl has been introduced to the United States, the United Kingdom, Mexico, Honduras, Costa Rica, Colombia, Guyana, Suriname, Brazil, Uruguay, Argentina, South Africa, Spain, Portugal, Greece, Italy, Madagascar, Mauritius, Réunion, Indonesia, Papua New Guinea, Australia, New Zealand, Croatia and the island of Lokrum.

Genome sequencing
The first whole-genome sequencing of Indian peafowl identified a total of 15,970 protein-coding sequences, along with 213 tRNAs, 236 snoRNAs, and 540 miRNAs. The peacock genome was found to have less repetitive DNA (8.62%) than that of the chicken genome (9.45%). PSMC analysis suggested that the peacock suffered at least two bottlenecks (around four million years ago and again 450,000 years ago), which resulted in a severe reduction in its effective population size.

Behaviour and ecology
Peafowl are best known for the male's extravagant display feathers which, despite actually growing from their back, are thought of as a tail. The "train" is in reality made up of the enormously elongated upper tail coverts. The tail itself is brown and short as in the peahen. The colours result not from any green or blue pigments but from the micro-structure of the feathers and the resulting optical phenomena. The long train feathers (and tarsal spurs) of the male develop only after the second year of life. Fully developed trains are found in birds older than four years. In northern India, these begin to develop each February and are moulted at the end of August. The moult of the flight feathers may be spread out across the year.

Peafowl forage on the ground in small groups, known as musters, that usually have a cock and 3 to 5 hens. After the breeding season, the flocks tend to be made up only of females and young. They are found in the open early in the mornings and tend to stay in cover during the heat of the day. They are fond of dust-bathing and at dusk, groups walk in single file to a favourite waterhole to drink. When disturbed, they usually escape by running and rarely take to flight.

Peafowl produce loud calls especially in the breeding season. They may call at night when alarmed and neighbouring birds may call in a relay like series. Nearly seven different call variants have been identified in the peacocks apart from six alarm calls that are commonly produced by both sexes.

Peafowl roost in groups during the night on tall trees but may sometimes make use of rocks, buildings or pylons. In the Gir forest, they chose tall trees in steep river banks. Birds arrive at dusk and call frequently before taking their position on the roost trees. Due to this habit of congregating at the roost, many population studies are made at these sites. The population structure is not well understood. In a study in northern India (Jodhpur), the number of males was 170–210 for 100 females but a study involving evening counts at the roost site in southern India (Injar) suggested a ratio of 47 males for 100 females.

Sexual selection

The colours of the peacock and the contrast with the much duller peahen were a puzzle to early thinkers. Charles Darwin wrote to Asa Gray that the "sight of a feather in a peacock's tail, whenever I gaze at it, makes me sick!" as he failed to see an adaptive advantage for the extravagant tail which seemed only to be an encumbrance. Darwin developed a second principle of sexual selection to resolve the problem, though in the prevailing intellectual trends of Victorian Britain, the theory failed to gain widespread attention.

The American artist Abbott Handerson Thayer tried to show, from his own imagination, the value of the eyespots as disruptive camouflage in a 1907 painting. He used the painting in his 1909 book Concealing-Coloration in the Animal Kingdom, denying the possibility of sexual selection and arguing that essentially all forms of animal colouration had evolved as camouflage. He was roundly criticised in a lengthy paper by Theodore Roosevelt, who wrote that Thayer had only managed to paint the peacock's plumage as camouflage by sleight of hand, "with the blue sky showing through the leaves in just sufficient quantity here and there to warrant the author-artists explaining that the wonderful blue hues of the peacock's neck are obliterative because they make it fade into the sky."

In the 1970s a possible resolution to the apparent contradiction between natural selection and sexual selection was proposed. Amotz Zahavi argued that peacocks honestly signalled the handicap of having a large and costly train. However, the mechanism may be less straightforward than it seems – the cost could arise from depression of the immune system by the hormones that enhance feather development.
The ornate train is believed to be the result of sexual selection by the females. Males use their ornate trains in a courtship display: they raise the feathers into a fan and quiver them. However, recent studies have failed to find a relation between the number of displayed eyespots and mating success. Marion Petrie tested whether or not these displays signaled a male's genetic quality by studying a feral population of peafowl in Whipsnade Wildlife Park in southern England. She showed that the number of eyespots in the train predicted a male's mating success, and this success could be manipulated by cutting the eyespots off some of the male's ornate feathers.

Although the removal of eyespots makes males less successful in mating, eyespot removal substantially changes the appearance of male peafowls. It is likely that females mistake these males for sub-adults, or perceive that the males are physically damaged. Moreover, in a feral peafowl population, there is little variation in the number of eyespots in adult males. It is rare for adult males to lose a significant number of eyespots. Therefore, females' selection might depend on other sexual traits of males' trains. The quality of train is an honest signal of the condition of males; peahens do select males on the basis of their plumage. A recent study on a natural population of Indian peafowls in the Shivalik area of India has proposed a "high maintenance handicap" theory. It states that only the fittest males can afford the time and energy to maintain a long tail. Therefore, the long train is an indicator of good body condition, which results in greater mating success. While train length seems to correlate positively with MHC diversity in males, females do not appear to use train length to choose males. A study in Japan also suggests that peahens do not choose peacocks based on their ornamental plumage, including train length, number of eyespots and train symmetry. Another study in France brings up two possible explanations for the conflicting results that exist. The first explanation is that there might be a genetic variation of the trait of interest under different geographical areas due to a founder effect and/or a genetic drift. The second explanation suggests that "the cost of trait expression may vary with environmental conditions," so that a trait that is indicative of a particular quality may not work in another environment.

Fisher's runaway model proposes positive feedback between female preference for elaborate trains and the elaborate train itself. This model assumes that the male train is a relatively recent evolutionary adaptation. However, a molecular phylogeny study on peacock-pheasants shows the opposite; the most recently evolved species is actually the least ornamented one. This finding suggests a chase-away sexual selection, in which "females evolve resistance to male ploys". A study in Japan goes on to conclude that the "peacocks' train is an obsolete signal for which female preference has already been lost or weakened".

However, some disagreement has arisen in recent years concerning whether or not female peafowl do indeed select males with more ornamented trains. In contrast to Petrie's findings, a seven-year Japanese study of free-ranging peafowl came to the conclusion that female peafowl do not select mates solely on the basis of their trains. Mariko Takahashi found no evidence that peahens expressed any preference for peacocks with more elaborate trains (such as trains having more ocelli), a more symmetrical arrangement, or a greater length. Takahashi determined that the peacock's train was not the universal target of female mate choice, showed little variance across male populations, and, based on physiological data collected from this group of peafowl, do not correlate to male physical conditions. Adeline Loyau and her colleagues responded to Takahashi's study by voicing concern that alternative explanations for these results had been overlooked, and that these might be essential for the understanding of the complexity of mate choice. They concluded that female choice might indeed vary in different ecological conditions.

A 2013 study that tracked the eye movements of peahens responding to male displays found that they looked in the direction of the upper train of feathers only when at long distances and that they looked only at the lower feathers when males displayed close to them. The rattling of the tail and the shaking of the wings helped in keeping the attention of females.

Breeding

Peacocks are polygamous, and the breeding season is spread out but appears to be dependent on the rains. Peafowls usually reach sexual maturity at the age of 2 to 3 years old. Several males may congregate at a lek site and these males are often closely related. Males at leks appear to maintain small territories next to each other and they allow females to visit them and make no attempt to guard harems. Females do not appear to favour specific males. The males display in courtship by raising the upper-tail coverts into an arched fan. The wings are held half open and drooped and it periodically vibrates the long feathers, producing a ruffling sound. The cock faces the hen initially and struts and prances around and sometimes turns around to display the tail. Males may also freeze over food to invite a female in a form of courtship feeding. Males may display even in the absence of females. When a male is displaying, females do not appear to show any interest and usually continue their foraging.

The peak season in southern India is April to May, January to March in Sri Lanka and June in northern India. The nest is a shallow scrape in the ground lined with leaves, sticks and other debris. Nests are sometimes placed on buildings and, in earlier times, have been recorded using the disused nest platforms of the white-rumped vultures. The clutch consists of 4–8 fawn to buff white eggs which are incubated only by the female. The eggs take about 28 days to hatch. The chicks are nidifugous and follow the mother around after hatching. Downy young may sometimes climb on their mothers' back and the female may carry them in flight to a safe tree branch. An unusual instance of a male incubating a clutch of eggs has been reported.

Feeding
Peafowl are omnivorous and eat seeds, insects (including termites), worms, fruits, small mammals, frogs, and reptiles (such as lizards). They feed on small snakes but keep their distance from larger ones. In the Gir forest of Gujarat, a large percentage of their food is made up of the fallen berries of Zizyphus. They also feed on tree and flower buds, petals, grain, and grass and bamboo shoots. Around cultivated areas, peafowl feed on a wide range of crops such as groundnut, tomato, paddy, chili and even bananas. Around human habitations, they feed on a variety of food scraps and even human excreta. In the countryside, it is particularly partial to crops and garden plants.

Mortality factors

Large animals such as leopards, dholes, golden jackals, and tigers can ambush adult peafowls. However, only leopards regularly prey upon peafowls as adult peafowls are difficult to catch since they can usually escape ground predators by flying into trees.  They are also sometimes hunted by large birds of prey such as the changeable hawk-eagle and rock eagle-owl. Chicks are somewhat more prone to predation than adult birds. Adults living near human habitations are sometimes hunted by domestic dogs or by humans in some areas (southern Tamil Nadu) for folk remedies involving the use of "peacock oil".

Foraging in groups provides some safety as there are more eyes to look out for predators. They also roost on high tree tops to avoid terrestrial predators, especially leopards.

In captivity, birds have been known to live for 23 years but it is estimated that they live for only about 15 years in the wild.

Conservation and status

Indian peafowl are widely distributed in the wild across South Asia and protected both culturally in many areas and by law in India. Conservative estimates of the population put them at more than 100,000. Illegal poaching for meat, however, continues and declines have been noted in parts of India. Peafowl breed readily in captivity and as free-ranging ornamental fowl. Zoos, parks, bird-fanciers and dealers across the world maintain breeding populations that do not need to be augmented by the capture of wild birds.

Poaching of peacocks for their meat and feathers and accidental poisoning by feeding on pesticide treated seeds are known threats to wild birds. Methods to identify if feathers have been plucked or have been shed naturally have been developed, as Indian law allows only the collection of feathers that have been shed.

In parts of India, the birds can be a nuisance to agriculture as they damage crops. Its adverse effects on crops, however, seem to be offset by the beneficial role it plays by consuming prodigious quantities of pests such as grasshoppers. They can also be a problem in gardens and homes where they damage plants, attack their reflections (thereby breaking glass and mirrors), perch and scratch cars or leave their droppings. Many cities where they have been introduced and gone feral have peafowl management programmes. These include educating citizens on how to prevent the birds from causing damage while treating the birds humanely.

In culture

Prominent in many cultures, the peacock has been used in numerous iconic representations, including being designated the national bird of India in 1963. The peacock, known as mayura in Sanskrit, has enjoyed a fabled place in India since and is frequently depicted in temple art, mythology, poetry, folk music and traditions. A Sanskrit derivation of mayura is from the root mi for kill and said to mean "killer of snakes". It is also likely that the Sanskrit term is a borrowing from Proto-Dravidian *mayVr (whence the Tamil word for peacock மயில் (mayil)) or a regional Wanderwort. Many Hindu deities are associated with the bird, Krishna is often depicted with a feather in his headband, while worshippers of Shiva associate the bird as the steed of the God of war, Kartikeya (also known as Skanda or Murugan). A story in the Uttara Ramayana describes the head of the Devas, Indra, who unable to defeat Ravana, sheltered under the wing of peacock and later blessed it with a "thousand eyes" and fearlessness from serpents. Another story has Indra who after being cursed with a thousand ulcers was transformed into a peacock with a thousand eyes and this curse was removed by Vishnu.

In Buddhist philosophy, the peacock represents wisdom. Peacock feathers are used in many rituals and ornamentation. Peacock motifs are widespread in Indian temple architecture, old coinage, textiles and continue to be used in many modern items of art and utility. A folk belief found in many parts of India is that the peacock does not copulate with the peahen but that she is impregnated by other means. The stories vary and include the idea that the peacock looks at its ugly feet and cries whereupon the tears are fed on by the peahen causing it to be orally impregnated while other variants incorporate sperm transfer from beak to beak. Similar ideas have also been ascribed to Indian crow species. In Greek mythology the origin of the peacock's plumage is explained in the tale of Hera and Argus. The main figure of the Yazidi religion Yezidism, Melek Taus, is most commonly depicted as a peacock. Peacock motifs are widely used even today such as in the logos of the US NBC and the PTV television networks and the Sri Lankan Airlines.

These birds were often kept in menageries and as ornaments in large gardens and estates. In medieval times, knights in Europe took a "Vow of the Peacock" and decorated their helmets with its plumes. In several Robin Hood stories, the titular archer uses arrows fletched with peacock feathers. Feathers were buried with Viking warriors and the flesh of the bird was said to cure snake venom and many other maladies. Numerous uses in Ayurveda have been documented. Peafowl were said to keep an area free of snakes. In 1526, the legal issue as to whether peacocks were wild or domestic fowl was thought sufficiently important for Cardinal Wolsey to summon all the English judges to give their opinion, which was that they are domestic fowl.

In Anglo-Indian usage of the 1850s, to peacock meant making visits to ladies and gentlemen in the morning. In the 1890s, the term "peacocking" in Australia referred to the practice of buying up the best pieces of land ("picking the eyes") so as to render the surrounding lands valueless. The English word "peacock" has come to be used to describe a man who is very proud or gives a lot of attention to his clothing.

A golden peacock (in Yiddish, Di Goldene Pave) is considered by some as a symbol of Ashkenazi Jewish culture, and is the subject of several folktales and songs in Yiddish.
Peacocks are frequently used in European heraldry. Heraldic peacocks are most often depicted as facing the viewer and with their tails displayed. In this pose, the peacock is referred to as being "in his pride". Peacock tails, in isolation from the rest of the bird, are rare in British heraldry, but see frequent use in German systems.

The American television network NBC uses a stylized peacock as a legacy of its early introduction of color television, alluding to the brilliant color of a peacock, and continues to promote the bird as a trademark of its broadcasting and streaming services.

References

Further reading
 Galusha, JG; Hill, LM (1996) A study of the behaviour of Indian Peacocks Pavo cristatus on Protection Island, Jefferson County, Washington, USA. Pavo 34(1&2):23–31.
 Ganguli, U (1965) A Peahen nests on a roof. Newsletter for Birdwatchers . 5(4):4–6.
 Prakash, M (1968) Mating of Peacocks Pavo cristatus. Newsletter for Birdwatchers . 8(6), 4–5.

External links
 Indian peafowl video clips from the BBC archive on Wildlife Finder
 First recorded breeding in the wild in Africa at adu.org.za
 Article with video about Indian peafowl at avibirds.com

Indian peafowl
National symbols of India
Birds of South Asia
Indian peafowl
Indian peafowl
Articles containing video clips